Coexister is a 2017 French comedy film directed and written by Fabrice Eboué.

Plot
Music producer Nicolas Lejeune is in desperate need for new stars because business is bad. His boss Sophie Demanche gives him a last chance and a deadline. Unless he discovers within six months musicians who are able to sell out the famous Olympia concert hall he will be fired. Right after he has accepted this challenge he vents off at a fancy dress party. The ext morning he checks the pictures which were taken with his smartphone during the night. Looking at partygoers dressed as priests inspires him. He decides to create a trio consisting of a Catholic priest, a rabbi and an imam. His assistant Sabrina soon finds a willing Catholic priest but they cannot find a real rabbi or a real imam. So they hire a mentally unstable former rabbi and a scoundrel who pretends to be an imam. This leads inevitably to a variety of issues.

Cast
 Ramzy Bedia: Moncef
 Guillaume de Tonquédec: Benoît
 Jonathan Cohen: Samuel
 Fabrice Eboué: Nicolas
 Audrey Lamy: Sabrina
 Mathilde Seigner: Sophie Demanche
 Amelle Chahbi: Alexia
 Michel Drucker: Himself
 Elisabeth Duda

References

External links
 
 Coexister at Uni France

2017 films
2017 comedy films
French comedy films
2010s French-language films
Films directed by Fabrice Eboué
2010s French films